Puran may refer to:

 Purana, a genre of ancient Indian literature
 Puran Tehsil, an administrative subdivision of Khyber Pakhtunkhwa, Pakistan
 Puran (name), a given name and surname (including a list of persons with the name)
 Puran-class barge, a class of ship
 INS Puran, a ship in the Indian navy

See also 
 Purana (disambiguation)
 Pooran (disambiguation)
 Purna (disambiguation)
 Puran poli, an Indian sweet flatbread